Coria Club de Fútbol is a Spanish football team based in Coria del Río, in the autonomous community of Andalusia. Founded in 1923, it plays in Tercera Federación – Group 10, holding home matches at Estadio Guadalquivir with a capacity of 5,000 seats.

History
In the 2017-18 season club managed to promote back to Tercera División after being relegated from it in 2017.

Season to season

3 seasons in Segunda División B
52 seasons in Tercera División
1 season in Tercera Federación

Former players
 Juan Velasco
 Mario Hidalgo
 Francisco Lledó
 Álvaro Cejudo
 José Manuel Casado
 Manuel Ruiz
 Manuel Asián Bejarano

Former coaches
 Francisco López
 Manuel Ruiz
 Juan Carlos Álvarez

References

External links
Official website 
Futbolme team profile 
Estadios de España 

Football clubs in Andalusia
Association football clubs established in 1923
1923 establishments in Spain
Province of Seville